Saʿd ibn Muʿādh was the chief of the Aws tribe in Medina and one of the prominent companions of the Islamic prophet Muhammad a.s. He died shortly after the Battle of the Trench.

Family
Sa'd was born in Medina 590 CE, the son of Mu'adh ibn al-Numan, of the Abdul-Ashhal clan of the Aws tribe, and of Kabsha bint Rafi, of the Jewish Banu al-Harith clan of the Khazraj tribe. His siblings were Aws (apparently the eldest), Iyas, 'Amr, Iqrab and Umm Hizam.

He married his brother Aws's widow, Hind bint Simak, who was his agnatic second cousin. Her brother had been chief of the Aws tribe until he was killed at the Battle of Bu'ath in 617. They had two sons, Amr and Abdullah.

As'ad ibn Zurarah, chief of the al-Najjar clan of the Khazraj, was Sa'd's maternal first cousin. Usayd ibn Hudayr was his wife's fraternal nephew, and was also said by al-Waqidi to have been Sa'd's first cousin.

Biography

Acceptance of Islam
Sa'd was among the leading figures among the Ansar, as Prophet Muhammad a.s had dubbed the people of Aws and Khazraj from Medina who converted to Islam. He converted at the hands of Mu'sab ibn Umair. His conversion led to the immediate conversion of his entire subtribe of the Aus, the Banu Abdul-Ashhal:

Confrontation with Abu Jahl and start of Badr hostilities
Prior to the Battle of Badr, Sa'd had visited Mecca once to perform his Umrah with his non-Muslim friend Umayyah ibn Khalaf, when they came across Abu Jahl. They had an argument, and as it became heated, Sa'd threatened Abu Jahl with preventing his safe passage through Medina if he stopped the Muslims from performing pilgrimage in Mecca.
Narrated 'Abdullah bin Mas'ud:

Battle of Badr
The Muslims originally expected a much smaller Meccan force, but were surprised by the large Meccan Army so Prophet Muhammad called Shura:

Battle of Uhud 
Sa'd was one of the few companions who remained on the battlefield, when the Meccans led by Khalid bin Walid counterattacked and he continued to fight on until he was finally forced to retreat away from the Meccans. In fact, Sa'd was the last Muslim Mus'ab ibn 'Umair met (Sa'd by that time had disengaged the Meccans) when he chided other Muslims for retreating and ferociously attacked the Meccans resulting in his brutal martyrdom at the hands of the Meccans. He later met up with Muhammad and was part of the small contingent Muslims defending him.

Sa'd's brother 'Amr and his stepson (nephew) al-Harith ibn Aws were both among those who were killed at Uhud.

Battle of Trench and Qurayza
After the Battle of the Trench in 627 (5 AH), when Medina was unsuccessfully besieged by the Meccan army, the Banu Qurayza had treacherous dealings with the enemy. Later the Muslims laid siege to their stronghold and the Banu Qurayza surrendered.

Several members of the Banu Aws pleaded for their old Jewish allies and agreed to Muhammad's proposal that one of their chiefs should judge the matter. The Banu Qurayza themselves appointed Sa'd, and declared they would agree with whatever was Sa'd's verdict. The verdict for the Banu Qurayza, a Jewish clan in Medina, was consistent with the Old Testament and some scholars claim the verdict was based on Deutoronomy 20:12-14.

Death
Sa'd had been wounded in the Battle of Khandaq, and was on the verge of death. Sa'd succumbed to the wounds and died after returning to Medina.

Legacy

He dutifully served as a member of the Muslim community and even commanded military campaigns for Muhammad during his lifetime. Saad is said to have been a stern, just and passionate man, willing to impulsively fight for what he believed in. In Muslim history, he is well regarded as a noble companion who enjoyed a close relationship with Muhammad.

Even after his death Muhammad a.s made constant references praising him:

According to one Hadith, Muhammad bestowed him a title of "Siddiq al-Ansar", (rightful man of Ansar or truthful man of Ansar), which according to later era scholars of Hadith, were counter part of Abu Bakr as-Siddiq, a Siddiq which hailed from Muhajirun.

Early Arabic rock inscription 
A rock inscription was discovered in mount Sela; In the fourth and fifth line appear the words, “I am Muhammad ibn Abdullah” and that is the full name of the prophet Muhammad as his father was Abdullah. In the eighth line is the name, “ I am Salman the (?)”. In the twelfth line is the phrase “I am Sa'd bin Mu'adh”, and finally on the fifteenth line “I am Ali ibn Abu Talib”. As it is known that Saad ibn Muad died in 627, the inscription can not be from a later era, further the location of this inscription may hint that it was meant to commemorate the Muslim victory in the battle.

Notes

References

590s births
627 deaths
Year of birth unknown
Sahabah killed in battle
Sahabah who participated in the battle of Uhud